The 2019–20 Northern Football League season was the 122nd in the history of Northern Football League, a football competition in England. The allocations for Steps 1 to 6 for season 2019–20 were announced by the FA on 19 May. These were subject to appeal, and the Northern League's constitution was ratified at the league's annual general meeting (AGM) on 15 June.

As a result of the COVID-19 pandemic, this season's competition was formally abandoned on 26 March 2020, with all results from the season being expunged, and no promotion or relegation taking place to, from, or within the competition. On 30 March 2020, sixty-six non-league clubs sent an open letter to the Football Association requesting that they reconsider their decision. A legal appeal against the decision, funded by South Shields of the Northern Premier League, was dismissed later in June.

Division One
At the end of the season 2018–19, one team left the division:
 Dunston UTS – promoted to Northern Premier League Division One North-West

The remaining seventeen teams, together with the following three, formed Division One for 2019–20:
 Billingham Town – promoted from Division Two
 Northallerton Town – promoted from Division Two
 Thornaby – promoted from Division Two

Division One table

Stadia and locations

Division Two

At the end of the season 2018–19, three teams left the division:
 Billingham Town – promoted to Division One
 Northallerton Town – promoted to Division One
 Thornaby – promoted to Division One

The remaining seventeen teams, together with the following three, formed Division Two for the 2019–20 season:
 Carlisle City – transferred from North West Counties League Division One North
 Newcastle University – promoted from the Northern Football Alliance
 Sunderland West End – promoted from the Wearside League

Division Two table

Stadia and locations

References

External links
 Northern Football League

2019–20
9
Association football events curtailed and voided due to the COVID-19 pandemic